The 2021–22 Division 1 Féminine season, also known as D1 Arkema for sponsorship reasons, was the 48th edition of Division 1 Féminine since its establishment in 1974. The season began on 27 August 2021 and ended on 1 June 2022. Paris Saint-Germain are the defending champions, having won their first ever league title in 2020–21 season.

On 29 May 2022, Lyon won their record 15th title following a 1–0 win against Paris Saint-Germain.

Teams

A total of 12 teams compete in the league. Saint-Étienne replaced Le Havre, who were relegated to Division 2 Féminine at the end of last season.

League table

Results

Positions by round
The table lists the positions of teams after each week of matches. In order to preserve chronological evolvements, any postponed matches are not included to the round at which they were originally scheduled, but added to the full round they were played immediately afterwards.

Season statistics

Top scorers

Most assists

Most clean sheets

Hat-tricks

Awards

Player of the Month

UNFP Awards

Nominations were announced on 3 May 2022. Winners along with the Team of the Year were announced on 15 May.

Note: Winners are displayed in boldface.

Player of the Year

Young Player of the Year

Goalkeeper of the Year

Team of the Year

FFF D1 Arkema Awards
Nominations for the Goal of the Season were announced on 12 May 2022. Other nominations were announced on 18 May. Winners along with Team of the Season were announced on 23 May.

Note: Winners are displayed in boldface.

Best Player

Best Young Player

Best Goalkeeper

Best Manager

Goal of the Season

Team of the Season

References

External links
  Official website
   FootoFéminin

Division 1 Féminine seasons
2021–22 domestic women's association football leagues
Division 1 Féminine